Flare is a science fiction novel by American writers Roger Zelazny and Thomas Thurston Thomas, published in 1992.

Flare describes the world as it may be in 2081, and the effects a future inter-planetary civilization would suffer if a solar flare occurred after almost 100 years without any solar activity.

The book takes a scientific approach to the idea, including almost no tangible story line.  It is broken into short segments which describe different people in various places suffering from the effects of the solar flare.

References

Novels by Roger Zelazny
Novels by Thomas T. Thomas
1992 American novels
Collaborative novels
1992 science fiction novels
American science fiction novels
2081